Lauzoua (also spelled Lozoua) is a town in southern Ivory Coast. It is a sub-prefecture of Guitry Department in Lôh-Djiboua Region, Gôh-Djiboua District. Less than two kilometres (about one mile) southeast of town is the border with Lagunes District.

Lauzoua was a commune until March 2012, when it became one of 1126 communes nationwide that were abolished.

In 2014, the population of the sub-prefecture of Lauzoua was 23,348.

Villages
The six villages of the sub-prefecture of Lauzoua and their population in 2014 were:
 Adahidoukou (9 121)
 Dougodou (6 367)
 Gbassepé (597)
 Gbobleko (801)
 Lauzoua (3 630)
 Lauzoua-Carrefour (2 832)

References

Sub-prefectures of Lôh-Djiboua
Former communes of Ivory Coast